Mauritius competed at the 2018 Commonwealth Games in the Gold Coast, Australia from April 4 to April 15, 2018.

Table tennis athlete Rhikesh Taucoory was the island's flag bearer during the opening ceremony.

Medalists

Competitors
The following is the list of number of competitors participating at the Games per sport/discipline.

Athletics

Men
Track & road events

Field events

Women
Track & road events

Field events

Badminton

Mauritius participated with six athletes (three men and three women)

Singles

Doubles

Mixed team

Roster

Aurélie Allet
Nicki Chan-Lam
Kate Foo Kune
Aatish Lubah
Julien Paul
Christopher Jean Paul

Pool B

Quarterfinals

Boxing

Mauritius participated with a team of 7 athletes (7 men)

Men

Cycling

Mauritius participated with 6 athletes (4 men and 2 women).

Road
Men

Women

Squash

Mauritius participated with 1 athlete (1 man).

Individual

Swimming

Mauritius participated with 5 athletes (4 men and 1 woman).

Men

Women

Table tennis

Mauritius participated with 6 athletes (3 men and 3 women).

Singles

Doubles

Team

Triathlon

Mauritius participated with 1 athlete (1 man).

Individual

Weightlifting

Mauritius participated with 10 athletes (5 men and 5 women).

Men

Women

Wrestling

Mauritius participated with 4 athletes (2 men and 2 women).

Repechage Format

Group stage Format

Controversy
 Mauritius chef de mission Kaysee Teeroovengadum, indecently assaulted a Mauritian female athlete on the Gold Coast one day out from the opening ceremony. At that night, after meeting with the member of the Olympic Committee and listening to the versions of the two people concerned, Teeroovengadum made the decision to stand down from his post.

See also
Mauritius at the 2018 Summer Youth Olympics

References

Nations at the 2018 Commonwealth Games
Mauritius at the Commonwealth Games
Com